Machlomovirus is a genus of plant viruses, in the family Tombusviridae. Plants serve as natural hosts. There is only one species in this genus: Maize chlorotic mottle virus (MCMV), which causes significant losses in maize production worldwide. MCMV was first identified in the U.S. state of Kansas causing Maize lethal necrosis disease/MLN/corn lethal necrosis, a severe disease that negatively affects all stages of development for maize plants.

Structure
Viruses in Machlomovirus are non-enveloped, with icosahedral and spherical geometries, and T=3 symmetry. The diameter is around 28-34 nm. Genomes are linear, around 4–5.4kb in length.

Life cycle
Viral replication is cytoplasmic. Entry into the host cell is achieved by penetration into the host cell. Replication follows the positive stranded RNA virus replication model. Positive stranded RNA virus transcription, using the premature termination model of subgenomic RNA transcription is the method of transcription. Translation takes place by leaky scanning, and suppression of termination. The virus exits the host cell by tubule-guided viral movement. Plants serve as the natural host. Transmission routes are mechanical, seed borne, and contact. Even a small incidence of seed transmission is problematic: Although Kimani et al. 2021 finds MCMV to be almost incapable of successfully making the jump from contaminated seed to infecting a seedling, even a small infected proportion of a field will infect the entire field (via vector) unless quickly removed.

References

External links
 Viralzone: Machlomovirus
 ICTV
 

Tombusviridae
Viral plant pathogens and diseases
Virus genera